Federalism has long been advocated as a means of resolving the ethnic issues and unbalanced development in Sri Lanka.

As the unitary state has resulted in uneven development across Sri Lanka, the Western Province dominates over the other eight provinces. Despite declining regional disparity, the Western Province continues to contribute the most to the gross domestic product (GDP), contributing 42%, while the second highest, the Southern Province, only represents 10.8% of the GDP. The Uva and Northern provinces represent the least with 5% and 3.6% respectively. Other provinces also have trouble attracting capital. This has resulted in calls for the abolishing of the unitary system and powers being devolved.

Further federalism has also been proposed as a solution the ethnic issues. The Tamil minority is underrepresented despite being the majority in the Northern Province. This also led to a civil war between the government and Tamil Nationalist militants. After the end of the war the Northern Province has shared the troubles of finding funds to rebuild damaged infrastructure. Provincial governments have been unable to finance the reconstruction of destroyed factories and damaged infrastructure to create employment. Federalism has been proposed as a method for sharing power.

Several heads of states such as S. W. R. D. Bandaranaike, J. R. Jayewardene, and Chandrika Kumaratunga have also accepted federalism as a solution to the island's issues, but did not implement a federal system.

References

External links 
 Federalism: Sri Lanka’s answer to ethnic war
 Federalism is a Solution to Resolve Ethnic Conflict

 
Sri Lanka
Political terminology in Sri Lanka